is a song recorded by Japanese boy band SMAP. The Noriyuki Makihara composed song was released as a single in 2003 and sold more than 2.57 million copies, becoming the third best-selling single in Japan in Oricon history. Along with Hikaru Utada's "Colors", it was one of the only two singles to sell over a million copies in 2003, a year that saw CD sales declining due to the Japanese economic slump.

The single made it to the top of the Oricon 2003 Yearly singles chart. As of December 2016 it is the third best-selling single in Japan, with 3.000 million copies sold. This song became popular in karaoke.

Track list

Charts and certifications

Charts

Certifications

References

2003 songs
2003 singles
Japanese-language songs
Victor Entertainment singles
Songs about flowers